The Pfrimm is a , left or western tributary of the Rhine in the Rhineland-Palatinate (Germany).

Course 
The Pfrimm rises in the southern part of the Donnersbergkreis. The spring is in a valley surrounded by the hills Sperberhöhe in the east, Salweidenkopf in the south and Schnepfberg in the southwest. In 1927, the spring was encased in basalt stones. It does not flow thought the nearby pond , which lies nearby to the west.

The Pfrimm flows primarily through agricultural areas, and mostly about parallel to the federal road B47.  The upper part of the river drains the northern parts of the North Palatine Uplands.  Below the Sippersfelder Weiher, it flows to the north, past Pfrimmerhof, which belongs to the municipality of Sippersfeld, then west past the hill  and through the village of Breunigweiler, where the Mohbach joins from the southeast.

After entering the Alzey Hills, the Pfrimm takes up the Bornbach and then flows northeastward past Standenbühl, while the Donnersberg mountains are a few kilometers further northeast.  Between Standenbühl and Dreisen, the Münsterhof, the former Premonstratensian abbey , is situated on the Pfrimm's southern shore.  An old bulging sandstone bridge from 1770 spans the river at this point.  Below Dreisen, the  joins from the west.  In Marnheim, the  joins, also from the west; at this point the Pfrimm Viaduct used to span the river, until it was demolished in 1945.  From here, the Pfrimm flows past Albisheim, then the  joins from the northwest.  It then flows east to Harxheim, where the  joins from the south.

The Pfrimm continues flowing east, into the Landkreis Alzey-Worms and thereby into Rhenish Hesse. It flows via Wachenheim to Monsheim, where it crosses under federal road B121. The section between Marnheim and Monsheim is known as the Zellertal valley.

The Pfrimm then reaches the urban district of Worms. It flows through the western ward of Pfeddersheim, where in 1525 the Battle of Pfeddersheim took place. To the west of the village, we find the recreational area  and the first of two so-called ox pianos (river crossings, see below).

The Pfrimm then flows through the city of Worms itself. This is the most straightened and canalized section of the river. A footpath runs on top of the dam alongside the river since 1890.

The Pfrimm then flows through the city center of Worms and turns north-northeast. The Rhine also forms the Worms city limit and the boundary between the states of Rhineland-Palatinate and Hesse.

Discharge 
In some years, the Pfrimm causes major flooding, for example in 1882, 1892, 1902, 1940, 1950, 1978, 1995 and 2003. A particularly high flood occurred on 27 November 1882, when all the mills along the river were flooded and the fields along the river were transformed into a series of lakes. The water flowed into the Rhine near the  Church.

Ox pianos

Between Pfiffligheim and Hochheim 
A weir was constructed across the Pfrimm in the 1890s slightly above the modern Karl-Bittel-Park. Directly below the weir a series of stepping stones was deployed below the weir in 1898. It is a combination of stone stairs leading down to Pfrimm steps and stepping stones lying in the river allowing pedestrians to cross. In the local vernacular it was called an "ox piano": "ox", because Karl Bittel, who constructed it, claimed even an ox would be capable of crossing, and "piano" because the stones were raised above the water like the black keys on a piano.

Later a regular footbridge was built above the weir, so that the ox piano lost its importance.  Nevertheless, the stones are still there and when the water level isn't too high, it can still be crossed.

Also, a fish ladder was added, allowing fish to overcome the weir.

In Pfeddersheim 
Here, a concrete dam and a weir were used to hold back the water and divert it into the (now abandoned) Mühlbach ("Mill Brook"). Water not needed by the mill was drained using an adjustable weir or, at higher water levels, across the entire width of the concrete barrier. Here, too, and "ox piano" was constructed, allowing pedestrians to cross the Pfrimm with dry feet, if the water level permitted. The Mill Brook was about a meter deep, near the weir even over two meters, and was used by local residents for swimming and diving, as was the waterfall created by the weir.

Traffic 
The Pfrimm is classified as a water body of the second category and can only be navigated in a canoe or a kayak.

Many state roads run through the Pfrimm valley and cross the river.  The federal road B47 run parallel to the river.  At Monsheim, the river passes under B271.  The Autobahn A63 accompanies the upper reaches of the Pfrimm from Standenbühl to Marnheim.  East of Pfeddersheim, the A61 crosses the river.  Near the mouth, the Pfrimm is crossed by the federal highway B9.

The Zeller Valley Railway, a regional branch line, serves the Pfrimm valley.

See also  	
List of rivers of Rhineland-Palatinate

External links 

 Heimatverein Worms-Pfiffligheim: Origin of the "ox piano" between Pfiffligheim and Hochheim
 Heimatverein Worms-Pfiffligheim: Pircture of the "ox piano" between Pfiffligheim and Hochheim

Rivers of Rhineland-Palatinate
North Palatinate
Rivers of Germany